The Bösentrift is a mountain of the Pennine Alps, overlooking Täsch and Zermatt in the canton of Valais. It lies north of the Oberrothorn.

References

External links
Bösentrift on Hikr

Mountains of the Alps
Alpine three-thousanders
Mountains of Switzerland
Mountains of Valais